The Great King is a 1942 German drama film directed by Veit Harlan and starring Otto Gebühr. It depicts the life of Frederick the Great, who ruled Prussia from 1740 to 1786.  It received the rare "Film of the Nation" distinction. It was part of a popular cycle of "Prussian films".

The film is a depiction of the Führerprinzip. The analogy to Adolf Hitler was so clear that Hitler sent a print to Benito Mussolini, and Joseph Goebbels warned against the drawing of the comparison in print, in particular, because of the pessimistic mood that opens the film.  After a sergeant gives an unauthorised order, the king orders him simultaneously promoted and punished. His later decision to desert results in his death because no disobedience is justified.  Goebbels declared that the parallels were not a matter of propaganda, but an obvious result of the parallels of history.

Goebbels also regarded it as instructive that current sufferings would be a source of strength. Goebbels had some difficulty with the Army High Command over this film because it depicted the king as being left in the lurch by his general. He complained that the army felt that any depiction, however historical, reflected badly on them.

Cast
 Otto Gebühr as Frederick II.
 Kristina Söderbaum as Luise Treskow
 Gustav Fröhlich as Treskow
 Hans Nielsen as Niehoff
 Paul Wegener as General Czernitscheff
 Paul Henckels as Grenadier Spiller
 Elisabeth Flickenschildt as Spiller's Wife
 Kurt Meisel as Alfons
 Hilde Körber as Elisabeth Christine
 Claus Clausen as Prince Henry the Older
 Klaus Detlef Sierck as Prince Henry the Younger
 Herbert Hübner as Count Finkenstein
 Franz Schafheitlin as Commandant Bernburg
 Otto F. Henning as General von Finken
 Reginald Pasch as General Manteufel
 Otto Graf as General Seydlitz
 Heinrich Schroth as General Balthasar Rudolf von Schenckendorf
 Leopold von Ledebur as General von Retzow

Awards
 Director Veit Harlan won the Mussolini Cup for Best Foreign Film at the 1942 Venice Film Festival.

Citations

References

External links

 Der große König Full film at the Deutsche Filmothek

1942 films
1940s historical drama films
Films of Nazi Germany
Cultural depictions of Frederick the Great
German historical drama films
1940s German-language films
German black-and-white films
Films directed by Veit Harlan
Prussian films
Films set in the 1750s
Films set in the 1760s
Seven Years' War films
Biographical films about German royalty
Tobis Film films
1942 drama films
Films set in the Kingdom of Prussia